"The Long Way Around" (a.k.a. "Taking the Long Way Around") is a song written by Natalie Maines, Martie Maguire, Emily Robison, and Dan Wilson and recorded by the American all-female trio Dixie Chicks for their seventh studio album, Taking the Long Way (2006). The song was released as the fifth and final single from the album.

Song information
The song is the opening track of Taking the Long Way and provides the album its title, which derives from the chorus. The song, just like "Not Ready to Make Nice", also refers to the controversy Natalie Maines caused when she said that the band is ashamed that the United States President George W. Bush is from their home-state of Texas. The line "Well I fought with a stranger and I met myself" is a reference to the public feud Maines had with Bush. Many people think that the line speaks of Toby Keith, but the writing of that line was discussed in "Shut Up & Sing." Also the line, "It's been two long years now, since the top of the world came crashing down." refers to their public problems with the concert where their notorious statement was made during their "Top of the World Tour."

Comments about the song by band members
This is what band members Emily and Natalie commented about the writing process of the song:

Emily: "That's a journey song, about the different stages in our lives. A recap of where we've been, where we're going - and it was nice to remind ourselves of all that."
Natalie: "We've always written songs that are about other people. It's so much harder to put yourself out there and be honest with your emotions and your beliefs, but the songs are so much better and mean so much more when you can let yourself be vulnerable."

Critical response
The Long Way Around received unanimous critical acclaim. It was ranked as the 20th best song of 2006 by Rolling Stone magazine, which called it "a heart-tugging guitar anthem for small-town girls with big dreams -- and the best ersatz Springsteen song in a year that was packed with them."

References

2006 singles
The Chicks songs
Song recordings produced by Rick Rubin
Songs written by Martie Maguire
Songs written by Emily Robison
Songs written by Dan Wilson (musician)
Songs written by Natalie Maines
Columbia Nashville Records singles
2006 songs